The 2013 UAB Blazers football team represented the University of Alabama at Birmingham (UAB) in the 2013 NCAA Division I FBS football season as a member of the East Division of Conference USA (C-USA). They were led by second year head coach Garrick McGee and played their home games at Legion Field in Birmingham, Alabama. Not only was it another losing season, but it proved to be McGee's last as head coach, and the penultimate season for the team overall before being reinstated in 2017.

Schedule

Awards
Jamarcus Nelson:
All-American
Conference USA special teams player of the year

References

UAB
UAB Blazers football seasons
UAB Blazers football